Culture shock is the feeling of anxiety when operating within a different culture.

Culture shock may also refer to:


People
 Culture Shock (musician), born James Pountney, a drum and bass artist signed to RAM Records

Art, entertainment, and media

Music
 Culture Shock (album), the second album by the American comedy band Da Yoopers
 Culture Shock (band), a former band featuring members of the bands Citizen Fish and Subhumans
 Culture Shock (group), an Australian dance group from the 1990s
 "Culture Shock", the 8th track on the Exmilitary mixtape, by the American hip hop group Death Grips
 "Culture Shock", a song on the 1985 album Soul Kiss by singer Olivia Newton-John

Radio
 Culture Shock (BBC World Service), a BBC World Service programme about the "latest global trends and ideas driving human behaviour"

Television
 "Culture Shock (Sam & Max)", season 1, episode 1 of the Sam & Max game series
 "Culture Shock" (SpongeBob SquarePants), a season 1 episode of SpongeBob SquarePants
 Culture Shock (TV series), a Travel Channel travel show on the customs and traditions of people around the world
WWE Culture Shock, a documentary series by a former WWE champion
 "Culture Shock" (Into the Dark), an episode of the first season of Into the Dark